Project Power is a 2020 American science fiction action film directed by Henry Joost and Ariel Schulman, produced by Eric Newman and Bryan Unkeless, and written by Mattson Tomlin. It stars Jamie Foxx, Joseph Gordon-Levitt, and Dominique Fishback, alongside Colson Baker, Rodrigo Santoro, Amy Landecker and Allen Maldonado, and follows a drug dealer, a police officer, and a former soldier who team up to stop the distribution of a pill that gives the user superpowers for five minutes.

The film was released on August 14, 2020, by Netflix. It received mixed-to-positive reviews from critics, who praised the performances of the cast, action sequences and visuals but criticized the screenplay.

Plot 
In near-future New Orleans, a mysterious distributor offers a free supply of "Power"—a pill that grants various superpowers for five minutes—to a group of drug dealers, including one named Newt.

Six weeks later, Newt's teenage cousin Robin, a dealer herself, is nearly robbed by customers seeking Power. She is rescued by NOPD Officer Frank Shaver, one of her regular buyers. Art, a man hunting for the distributor "Biggie", tracks down Newt, who dies after a struggle when he overdoses on Power. Frank foils a bank robbery by a Power-enhanced thief, but is suspended for using Power himself. His captain reveals that government personnel are pressuring him to terminate any investigation into Power, and gives Frank a picture of the man they suspect to be the source of the drug: Art.

Using Newt's phone to find and abduct Robin, Art forces her to take him to the drug cartel's safehouse. He is shot while eliminating several of the cartel's men, and discovers that Power users throughout New Orleans are being monitored as test subjects for the drug. Art bonds with Robin as they treat his wounds, and reveals that after leaving the military, he was recruited by Teleios, a private defense contractor who experimented on him to create superpowers. His daughter Tracy, born after the experiments, exhibited powers without ever taking the drug, and was abducted by Wallace, a Teleios operative.

Art and Robin find Biggie hosting a private demonstration of Project Power for a potential buyer near the Superdome, where large groups of Saints fans are arriving for a home game. Biggie claims that Power represents "the next evolution of the human species", with the pill's powers derived from the abilities of animals, such as the chameleon or the wolverine frog. Art interrogates Biggie at gunpoint and learns of a ship, the Genesis, but Frank intervenes, having tracked other users to the demonstration. Biggie takes a dose of Power, forcing Art, Robin, and Frank to flee as Art kills Biggie in an explosion.

Frank arrests Art and informs his captain, but Art explains that the Power epidemic in New Orleans is mass testing to stabilize the drug, and that Tracy is the source of the drug's powers. Having convinced Frank that his captain is actually taking orders from Teleios, Art purposely has himself captured by Teleios and taken aboard the Genesis. Frank and Robin infiltrate the ship, and Art persuades a guard to free him. Frank and Art kill Wallace, while Robin finds Tracy and reunites her with her father.

As the four attempt to flee, Robin is captured by Dr. Gardner, the head of Project Power, who demands Tracy in exchange for Robin's life. Art confronts Gardner, using Power, which gives him the ability of a pistol shrimp to finally kill Gardner and her men. Despite this costing Art his life, Tracy ultimately resurrects him with her powers. They all escape the ship.

Frank intends to expose Project Power to the press, while Art decides to move on. He gives Robin his truck and a bag full of money to cover her mother's medical needs, telling her to use the greatness inside of her. Art and Tracy depart, finally free. Meanwhile, Robin begins a new career as a rapper.

Cast
 Jamie Foxx as Art; a U.S. Army Major and Delta Force operator who was one of Power's original test subjects; he possesses the ability inherited from a pistol shrimp, thus being able to launch powerful heatwaves from his body.
 Joseph Gordon-Levitt as Frank Shaver; a NOPD detective. He receives Power that hardens his skin, effectively making him bulletproof. This ability is probably inherited from an armadillo and does not give invulnerability, but just lowers the amount of damage received to the point Frank does not receive any serious injuries. His ability also gives him a strength boost.
 Dominique Fishback as Robin Reilly; a street-smart Power dealer who aspires to be a rap artist.
 Colson Baker as Newt; Robin's cousin and fellow Power dealer, who possesses the ability of thermal regulation that allows him to generate fire from his body. However, this ability only offers him limited fire resistance, leaving him with serious burns on his body from overuse.
 Rodrigo Santoro as Biggie; one of Power's creators, who possesses the ability to rapidly increase in size and strength.
Amy Landecker as Gardner
Allen Maldonado as Landry
Kyanna Simone Simpson as Tracy; Art's daughter who possess the ability to heal organic matter; her powers were inherited from her father and come naturally.
Andrene Ward-Hammond as Irene
Courtney B. Vance as Captain Crane; Shaver's NOPD commanding officer.
Casey Neistat as Moto, Candy's boyfriend.
Jim Klock as Mr. Luker
Luke Hawx as Bouncer
Janet Rose Nguyen as Deli Girl
Rose Bianco as the Matriarch
Tait Fletcher as Wallace; an employee of Gardner's who possesses the ability of superhuman strength probably inherited from a rhinoceros or a gorilla. Downside is that he receives damage as usual since he does not have an ability to protect his body from taking damage.
Yoshi Sudarso as Knifebones; a henchman of Gardner's who possesses the ability of turning his bones into weapons. His power was inherited from a wolverine frog.
Jane Chika Oranika as Akeela; Robin's classmate.
Jazzy De Lisser as Candy; Moto's girlfriend who was given a pill to test it out. She inherited an ability of thermal regulation, but instead of Newt's immolation, she can lower the temperature of her own body and her surroundings to extremely low temperatures.
Cory Demeyers as Griff; a Power user and bank robber, that Frank pursues. He inherited the ability of skin camouflage from an octopus or chameleon.
C.J. LeBlanc as Miggs
Azhar Khan as Guello; one of the drug dealers standing higher in the chain after Robin. Art asks Robin to go to him to find information of the one who kidnapped his daughter. He inherited an ability of spontaneous regeneration, allowing him to heal with increased speed from a lizard.

Production
In October 2017, it was announced that Netflix had acquired Mattson Tomlin's spec script Power in a bidding war with several other studios. Ariel Schulman and Henry Joost would direct the film, with Eric Newman and Bryan Unkeless producing. In September 2018, Jamie Foxx, Joseph Gordon-Levitt and Dominique Fishback joined the cast of the then-untitled film. In October 2018, Rodrigo Santoro, Amy Landecker, Allen Maldonado, Kyanna Simone Simpson, Andrene Ward-Hammond, Machine Gun Kelly, and Casey Neistat joined the cast of the film. In November 2018, Jim Klock joined the cast of the film. In December 2018, Courtney B. Vance joined the cast of the film. In July 2020, it was announced that the film would officially be titled Project Power.

Filming
Principal photography began on October 8, 2018 and concluded on December 22, 2018. Filming took place in New Orleans. On October 31, 2018, Joseph Gordon-Levitt was injured during filming while riding a bicycle. The film had a total production budget of $85.1 million, with $80.4 million spent on-location in Louisiana.

Reception

Viewership
Project Power was released by Netflix on August 14, 2020. It was the top-streamed film on the platform in its first two weekends before finishing in second place in its third. In October 2020, Netflix reported 75 million households watched the film over its first four weeks of release. In November, Variety reported the film was the 12th-most watched straight-to-streaming title of 2020 up to that point.

Critical response 
The website's critics' consensus reads: "Although it wastes some of the potential of its premise, Project Power is a slick, fun action thriller - and features a star-making turn from Dominique Fishback." Metacritic assigned the film a weighted average score of 51 out of 100, based on 35 critics, indicating "mixed or average reviews".

Writing for The Hollywood Reporter, David Rooney said that "what makes Project Power entertaining is its canny combination of familiar ingredients in a textured real-world milieu that gives it fresh flavor." Kate Erbland of IndieWire gave the film a "C+" and said that "Project Power wrestles with a litany of thorny moral issues (and not only those of the 'great power, great responsibility' vibe) but never fully engages with them. There's broad strokes about the impact of Hurricane Katrina on New Orleans residents, and a paper-thin exploration of the criminal implications of a cop not only using the drug, but buying it off a teenage dealer."

Accolades

References

External links
 
 

2020 films
2020 science fiction films
2020 action thriller films
2020s superhero films
American superhero films
American action thriller films
American science fiction thriller films
American science fiction films
Superhero thriller films
Smart drugs in fiction
English-language Netflix original films
2020s English-language films
Transhumanism in film
Fictional portrayals of the New Orleans Police Department
Films directed by Henry Joost and Ariel Schulman
Films scored by Joseph Trapanese
Films set in New Orleans
Films shot in New Orleans
Films with screenplays by Mattson Tomlin
2020s American films